The following is a list of current European League of Football team rosters and staffs for the 2022 season:

2022 ELF rosters

Northern Conference

Central Conference

Southern Conference

2022 ELF staffs

Northern Conference

Central Conference

Southern Conference

References

European League of Football seasons